The Romanian Air Force 71st Air Base is located near the city of Câmpia Turzii, in Cluj County. The 71st Airbase was founded on 1 June 2002, according to the Romanian Armed Forces reorganization program.  It is named after Emanoil Ionescu, a general who commanded the Royal Romanian Air Force during World War II.

Since its foundation, the unit has become one of the best units of the Air Force thanks to the pilots' proficiency in carrying out flight missions, day and night and all-weather, and to the responsibility of the logistic support personnel.

In January 2001, the unit received the first MIG-21 LanceR fighter planes, and the pilots started the transition to the new model.

The base is home to the 711th Fighter Squadron, operating MiG-21 LanceR, the 713th Helicopter Squadron, operating IAR-330. The 712th Helicopter Squadron is located at the Giarmata Airport. The base also hosts MQ-9 Reaper drones of the 31st Expeditionary Operations Group, Detachment 1, maintained by the 731st Expeditionary Attack Squadron and operated remotely by the 25th Attack Group.

History
The Câmpia Turzii military airfield was built between 1952 and 1953, and was home of the Soviet-made Ilyushin Il-10 attack aircraft. In 1969, an air defence unit was created on the airfield in order to provide protection against air attacks. In 1980 a paratrooper regiment was founded and assigned to the Campia Turzii. On 30 June 1982 the first fighter squadron was assigned at the air base, which in 1986 became the 71st Fighter Regiment. In 1987, when the air base finally became fully operational and operated MiG-21 fighters.

On 24 January 2001 the unit was the first one to receive the modernized MiG-21 LanceR fighters, which carry the Matra Magic 2 missile. On 1 July 2002, according to a Romanian Armed Forces reorganization and modernization program, the 71st Air Base was officially founded. During late 2004, the RoAF 93rd Air Base was disbanded and its helicopter units were relocated at the 71st base. Since then, the 71st Air Base participated in a large number of national/multinational military exercises and training missions. Also, it often participated in various humanitarian missions, in cooperation with other Romanian Government institutions.

The William M. (Mac) Thornberry National Defense Authorization Act for Fiscal Year 2021 includes $130.5 million to renovate Câmpia Turzii Air Base, in order to enhance the United States' ability to use it to for operations in the Black Sea region.

2007 Baltic Air Policing

 
Four MiG-21 LanceR Cs belonging to 71st Air Base were deployed from August 2007 to November 2007 at Šiauliai, in Lithuania for Baltic Air Policing. The Romanian detachment succeeds the French Air Force Mirage 2000Cs of Escadron de Chasse 01.012 from Cambrai, which fulfilled the Baltic Air Policing since May 2007. Once the RoAF finish its three-month stint, a Portuguese Air Force detachment will take over the mission.

The four aircraft and a total of 67 personnel, among them nine pilots, are part of the detachment: 63 serve at Šiauliai, while other four serve at the air traffic control centre in Kaunas, to ensure smooth cooperation with local authorities. The Romanian detachment has attracted huge attention from the local media, not least from the fact that it is only the second time a fighter from the Soviet era has deployed to Šiauliai; Polish Air Force MiG-29s have also been deployed there in 2006. The RoAF will most probably perform again Baltic Air Policing in future.

2008 Bucharest summit
Six United States Air Force McDonnell Douglas F-15E Strike Eagle fighters were deployed from 27 March to 6 April 2008, in order to provide air policing together with the Romanian Air Force fighters during the NATO 2008 Bucharest Summit, the 20th, held at Bucharest. These fighters were assisted by Boeing KC-135 Stratotankers located at the Budapest Airport in Hungary. The 323d Air Expeditionary Wing directed the USAF deployment.

International Deployments

A Royal Canadian Air Force detachment of 4 x McDonnell Douglas CF-18 Hornets was based here between unknown and 26 August 2014, when the detachment was moved to Šiauliai Air Base for Baltic Air Policing duties.

In March 2015, an advance group of four A-10s of the U.S. Air Force arrived to take part in an exercise. The “Dacian Thunder 2015” operation, held between 27 March and 7 July 2015, involved 350 soldiers and 12 A-10s.

In 2019, the first MQ-9 Reapers of the US Air Force were deployed at the base. These drones were operated by the 52nd Expeditionary Operations Group, Detachment 2 based at Mirosławiec in Poland. In 2020, they participated in the "Dacian Reaper-20" exercise.

In February 2021, the US Air Force deployed approximately 90 airmen and several MQ-9 drones of the 31st Expeditionary Operations Group, Detachment 1 at the base. The Reapers started flying remote-split operations on 1 February. The drones are managed by the newly activated 731st Expeditionary Attack Squadron while air operations are handled by the 25th Attack Group, located at the Shaw Air Force Base, South Carolina. The group is subordinated to the 432nd Air Expeditionary Wing.

On 14 July 2022, one of the drones crashed in a cornfield south of the base, while conducting a training mission.

Gallery

References

External links

  71st Air Base on the Romanian Air Force official website
  Order of Battle of the RoAF

71
Buildings and structures in Cluj County
Military units and formations established in 2002
2002 establishments in Romania
Câmpia Turzii